Dan Clark (born 1976) is an English actor, stand-up comedian, scriptwriter and television director.

Dan Clark may also refer to:
Dan Clark (ice hockey) (born 1957), Canadian hockey player 
Dan Clark (motivational speaker) (born 1955), American author, CEO, and motivational teacher
Dan Clark (Canadian football) (born 1988), Canadian football offensive lineman

See also
Dan Clarke (born 1983), British auto racing driver
Daniel Clark (disambiguation)
Danny Clark (disambiguation)